is a former Japanese football player.

Playing career
Yoshito Matsushita played for Albirex Niigata Singapore, Arterivo Wakayama, Grulla Morioka, ReinMeer Aomori from 2008 to 2015.

References

External links

1989 births
Living people
Association football people from Wakayama Prefecture
Japanese footballers
J3 League players
Iwate Grulla Morioka players
ReinMeer Aomori players
Association football goalkeepers